Catopygus is an extinct genus of sea urchins in the family Nucleolitidae.

See also 
 List of prehistoric echinoid genera
 List of prehistoric echinoderm genera

References

External links 
 
 

Echinoidea genera
Prehistoric echinoid genera